The following is a list of squads for each team competing in men's football at the 1906 Intercalated Games in Athens.

Ages as of the start of the tournament, 23 April 1906.

Athens
 Nation: 

The Athens team was represented by the club side Ethnikos Syllogos, reinforced with one player of Panellinios, both from Athens.

Denmark
 Nation: 

The Denmark team was a selection of players from Copenhagen by the Copenhagen Football Association.

Smyrna
 Nation: 

The Smyrna mixed team consisted of British (English), French and Armenian players that were merchants from the Ottoman city of Smyrna (now İzmir).

Thessaloniki
 Nation: 

The Thessaloniki team was composed of Greeks from Thessaloniki (though part of the Ottoman Empire) which were members of the group of "Friends of the Arts" (Omilos Philomuson, later Iraklis Thessaloniki F.C.).

Notes

References

1906
Squads